Anisosticta bitriangularis, known generally as the marsh lady beetle or swamp lady beetle, is a species of lady beetle in the family Coccinellidae. It is found in Europe and Northern Asia (excluding China) and North America.

References

Further reading

 

Coccinellidae
Articles created by Qbugbot
Beetles described in 1824